Anisopodus dominicensis is a species of beetle in the family Cerambycidae that was described by Villiers in 1980.

References

Anisopodus
Beetles described in 1980